Postal codes in Indonesia, known in Indonesian as kode pos consist of 5 digits.

 The first digit indicates the region in which a given post office falls in,
 The second and third digits indicate the regency (kabupaten) or city (kota madya),
 The fourth digit indicates the district or kecamatan within the kabupaten or kota, 
 The fifth digit indicates the commune or village or kelurahan/desa.

There is an exception for Jakarta postal codes:

 The third digit indicates the district (kecamatan)
 The fourth digit indicates the urban village (kelurahan)
 The fifth digit is a "0".

There are postal code zones covering the Indonesian provinces or islands as follows:

References

External links
Nomor.net - Kode Pos Indonesia (comprehensive Indonesian postal code database, compiled from government sources)

Indonesia
Postal system of Indonesia
Philately of Indonesia